"Popular" is a song by British rapper M.I.A. It was released on 12 August 2022 as the second single from her sixth studio album Mata.

Music video 
The official music video for the song was directed by Arnaud Bresson. It stars what was described as an "influencer-bot-in-training" named M.A.I. – a pun alluding to artificial intelligence. In the video, the singer trains her robot alter ego to dance to the title song. In the end, she kills it with a water gun. The video was released on 12 August 2022.

Track listing 
 Digital download
 "Popular" – 3:06

 Streaming
 "Popular" – 3:06
 "The One" – 2:25

Charts

References 

2022 singles
2022 songs
M.I.A. (rapper) songs
Song recordings produced by Diplo
Songs written by M.I.A. (rapper)
Songs written by Boaz van de Beatz
Songs written by Diplo